Rāvaṇa is a Sri Lankan teledrama by TV Derana airing two episodes every week (on Saturday and Sunday). The season 1 of the series began airing from 25 November 2018, and continued for around 10 months till 4 August 2019, airing 71 episodes in total. The season 2 of the series has resumed airing from 14 March 2020 till 15 November 2020, airing 59 episodes till now over the 8 months. The season 3 shooting is said to have been paused due to the COVID-19 pandemic situation.

The series is about the epic of Rāvaṇa Kāviyam (a Sinhalese description of Ramayana), where Ravana of Lanka is the protagonist and Rama of Bharata is the antagonist.

References

Sri Lankan drama television series
TV Derana original programming